The colorectal adenoma is a benign glandular tumor of the colon and the rectum. It is a precursor lesion of the colorectal adenocarcinoma (colon cancer). They often manifest as colorectal polyps.

Comparison table

Tubular adenoma

In contrast to hyperplastic polyps, these display dysplasia.

Tubulovillous adenoma
Tubulovillous adenoma, TVA are considered to have a higher risk of becoming malignant (cancerous) than tubular adenomas.

Villous adenoma
These adenomas may become malignant (cancerous). Villous adenomas have been demonstrated to contain malignant portions in about 15–25% of cases, approaching 40% in those over 4 cm in diameter. Colonic resection may be required for large lesions. These can also lead to secretory diarrhea with large volume liquid stools with few formed elements. They are commonly described as secreting large amounts of mucus, resulting in hypokalaemia in patients. On endoscopy, a "cauliflower' like mass is described due to villi stretching. Being an adenoma, the mass is covered in columnar epithelial cells.

Sessile serrated adenoma

Sessile serrated adenomas are characterized by (1) basal dilation of the crypts, (2) basal crypt serration, (3) crypts that run horizontal to the basement membrane (horizontal crypts), and (4) crypt branching.  The most common of these features is basal dilation of the crypts.

See also
Colorectal cancer
Colorectal polyp

References

Digestive system neoplasia
Gross pathology
Large intestine